The Rachel Carson Prize is awarded annually by the Society for Social Studies of Science, an international academic association based in the United States. It is given for a book "of social or political relevance" in the field of science and technology studies.  This prize was created in 1996.

Honorees

References 

Science and technology studies
Sociology awards
American non-fiction literary awards
Awards established in 1996
Prize